Raymond Akwete "Ray" Narh (born 21 July 1978) is a Ghanaian former professional boxer who competed from 2001 to 2014. He is a former WBC–USNBC light welterweight champion. As an amateur, Narh represented Ghana at the 2000 Olympics, reaching the second round of the lightweight bracket before losing to Andreas Kotelnik.

Amateur career
Narh was a gold medallist in the lightweight category at the 1998 Commonwealth Games. He was also a member of the 2000 Ghanaian Summer Olympic team and his cousin Ben Neequaye was also a member of the team. At Sydney, Australia he beat Victor Ramos but then lost to the silver medalist and future WBA Light Welterweight Champion Andriy Kotelnik.

Professional boxing career
Narh's only loss was to a then undefeated Kid Diamond.

NABC lightweight champion
He then beat Jadschi Green to win the North American Boxing Council Lightweight Championship; the bout was held at Heinz Field in Pittsburgh, Pennsylvania.

In March 2011, Narh beat Freddie Norwood to retain his WBC USNBC Light Welterweight Championship.

On May 7, 2011, Narh lost to undefeated Mexican-American Mike Alvarado, with the WBC Continental Americas Light Welterweight Championship on the line. This bout was on Showtime's televised portion of the Pacquiao vs. Mosley undercard.

Professional boxing record

|- style="margin:0.5em auto; font-size:95%;"
|align="center" colspan=8|25 Wins (21 knockouts), 2 Losses, 0 Draw
|- style="margin:0.5em auto; font-size:95%;"
|align=center style="border-style: none none solid solid; background: #e3e3e3"|Res.
|align=center style="border-style: none none solid solid; background: #e3e3e3"|Record
|align=center style="border-style: none none solid solid; background: #e3e3e3"|Opponent
|align=center style="border-style: none none solid solid; background: #e3e3e3"|Type
|align=center style="border-style: none none solid solid; background: #e3e3e3"|Rd., Time
|align=center style="border-style: none none solid solid; background: #e3e3e3"|Date
|align=center style="border-style: none none solid solid; background: #e3e3e3"|Location
|align=center style="border-style: none none solid solid; background: #e3e3e3"|Notes
|-align=center
|Loss || 25-2 ||align=left| Mike Alvarado
|TKO || 3 (3:00) || May 7, 2011 || align=left|MGM Grand, Paradise, Nevada, U.S.
|align=left|For the WBC Continental Americas Light Welterweight title
|-align=center
|Win || 25-1 ||align=left| Freddie Norwood
|UD || 10 (10) || March 4, 2011 || align=left|Jostens Center, Lake Buena Vista, Florida, U.S.
|align=left|Retained his WBC USNBC title
|-align=center

References

External links

Olympic boxers of Ghana
Welterweight boxers
1978 births
Living people
Boxers at the 2000 Summer Olympics
Boxers at the 1998 Commonwealth Games
Commonwealth Games gold medallists for Ghana
Ghanaian male boxers
Commonwealth Games medallists in boxing
Boxers from Accra
Medallists at the 1998 Commonwealth Games